Medieval medicine may refer to:

 Medieval medicine of Western Europe, pseudoscientific ideas from antiquity during the Middle Ages
 Byzantine medicine, common medical practices of the Byzantine Empire from about 400 AD to 1453 AD
 Medicine in the medieval Islamic world, the science of medicine developed in the Middle East
 Development of medicine in Azerbaijan during the Middle Ages
 Practices of Jewish medicine during the Middle Ages

See also
 History of medicine
 Ibn Sina Academy of Medieval Medicine and Sciences, a trust registered in India in 1882
 Medicine in ancient Rome, various techniques influenced by Greek medicine
 On Ancient Medicine, c. 400 BC medical text associated with Hippocrates
 Traditional Chinese medicine, a branch of traditional medicine in China